Arthur Cooper may refer to:

 Arthur Cooper (footballer, born 1921) (1921–2008), English footballer
 Arthur Cooper (footballer, born 1895), English footballer
 Arthur Cooper (athlete) (born 1952), Trinidad and Tobago sprinter
 Arthur Charles Cooper (1864–1921), member of the Queensland Legislative Assembly
 G. Arthur Cooper (1902–2000), American paleobiologist
 Arthur Cooper (translator) (1916–1988), British diplomat and translator of Chinese literature

See also 
 Arthur Melbourne-Cooper (1874–1961), British photographer and filmmaker